The 2011 British Academy Scotland Awards were held on 13 November 2011 at the Radisson Blu Hotel in Glasgow, honouring the best Scottish film and television productions of 2011.  Presented by BAFTA Scotland, accolades are handed out for the best in feature-length film that were screened at British cinemas during 2011. The ceremony returned after a one-year absence. The Nominees were announced on 17 October 2011. The ceremony was broadcast online via YouTube and was hosted by Kevin Bridges.

Robbie Coltrane, David Peat, and Eileen Gallagher were honoured with Outstanding Contribution awards at this ceremony.

Winners and nominees

Winners are listed first and highlighted in boldface.

Outstanding Contribution to Film
Robbie Coltrane

Outstanding Contribution to Craft (In Memory of Robert McCann)
David Peat

Outstanding Contribution to Broadcasting
Eileen Gallagher

BAFTA Scotland Cineworld Audience Award
Fast Romance

See also
BAFTA Scotland
64th British Academy Film Awards
83rd Academy Awards
17th Screen Actors Guild Awards
31st Golden Raspberry Awards

References

External links
BAFTA Scotland Home page

2011
2011 in British cinema
British
British
2011 in Scotland
2010s in Glasgow
BAF
Brit
November 2011 events in the United Kingdom